, abbreviated as TDMO, is one of the five District Meteorological Observatories of the Japan Meteorological Agency. It has jurisdiction over the Kantō and Chūbu regions: Tokyo, Kanagawa, Chiba, Saitama, Ibaraki, Tochigi, Gunma, Yamanashi, Nagano, Niigata, Shizuoka, Aichi, Gifu, Mie, Ishikawa, Toyama and Fukui, and is responsible for acquiring meteorological, hydrological, seismological and volcanological data and forecasting local weather conditions in those areas through its local meteorological observatories. The TDMO is based inside the JMA Meteorological Satellite Center located in Kiyose, Tokyo.

The LMOs within TDMO's supervision

Local Meteorological Observatories 
Bold-faced LMOs are the Region Central Forecast Offices.

Aviation Weather Service Centers

Resident Offices for Volcanic Disaster Mitigation

References

External links
 Tokyo District Meteorological Observatory (Japanese)

Japan Meteorological Agency